The Escuela Normal "Moisés Sáenz Garza" is a normal school in Monterrey. Eduardo Livas Villarreal, then governor of Nuevo León and Profr. Ciro R. Cantú (First Dean) founded the school in 1961.

In 1988 at hundredth anniversary of the birth the name is changed to Escuela Normal "Moisés Sáenz Garza" in honor to Moisés Sáenz Garza former Public Education Minister, who founded the system of secondary education in México at 1921 with law proclaimed by President Plutarco Elías Calles.

The school offers the bachelor's degree in secondary education with a speciality in Spanish Language, Mathematics, History, Geography, Physics, Chemistry, Biology, Civics and Ethics and Foreign Language-English. Since 1978 offers postgraduate degrees in the Graduates School, offering degrees in Master and Doctorate in Educational Philosophy with speciality at Elementary Education, Secondary education in Vocational guide, Adolescent Psychology, Human Sciences (History, Geography, Civics and Ethics), Natural and Exact Sciences, Spanish Literature and Education of the Mathematics.

It also offers various diploma courses in Arts and Painting, Printed, Theatre, Music, Dance versions of Huapango, Danzon and Northern, as additional Marching War Band and National Flag Escort course, all curricular value.

Its location is Venustiano Carranza avenue and corner of Ruperto Martínez street, in the Centro neighborhood of that city; integral part of the Educational center "Venustiano Carranza" which includes an elementary school, a secondary school or Junior High School, teacher research center (IIIEPE, Instituto de Investigación, Innovación y Estudios de Posgrado para la Educación) a principal square where rehearses Marching War band of the Militarized Pentathlon, a gym to practice racquetball and Pelota, No.1 regional offices of the Ministry of Education

In 2011 the Escuela Normal Superior celebrate the 50th Anniversary and 2013 its inauguration of Building of Arts and sciences, to promote professionalism and teaching practice by Rodrigo Medina de la Cruz, governor of Nuevo León and Profr. Humberto Leal Martínez, School Dean.

References

Universities and colleges in Nuevo León
Education in Nuevo León
1961 establishments in Mexico